The politics of Sichuan Province in the People's Republic of China is structured in a dual party-government system like all other governing institutions in mainland China.

The Governor of Sichuan is the highest-ranking official in the People's Government of Sichuan. However, in the province's dual party-government governing system, the Governor has less power than the Sichuan Chinese Communist Party (CCP) Provincial Committee Secretary, colloquially termed the "Sichuan CCP Party Chief".

List of the CCP Sichuan Committee secretaries
Li Jingquan (李井泉): July 1952-February 1965
Liao Zhigao (廖志高): February 1965 – 1966
Zhang Guohua (张国华): August 1971-February 1972
Liu Xingyuan (刘兴元): March 1972-October 1975
Zhao Ziyang (赵紫阳): October 1975-March 1980
Tan Qilong (谭启龙): March 1980-February 1983
Yang Rudai (杨汝岱): February 1983-April 1993
Xie Shijie (谢世杰): April 1993-January 2000
Zhou Yongkang (周永康): January 2000-December 2002
Zhang Xuezhong (张学忠): December 2002 – 2006
Du Qinglin (杜青林): December 2006-November 2007
Liu Qibao (刘奇葆): November 2007-November 2012
Wang Dongming (王东明): November 2012-March 2018
Peng Qinghua (彭清华): March 2018-April 2022
Wang Xiaohui (王晓晖): April 2022-present

List of governors of Sichuan
Li Jingquan (李井泉): September 1952-January 1955
Li Dazhang (李大章): January 1955 – 1966
Zhang Guohua (张国华): May 1968-February 1972
Liu Xingyuan (刘兴元): March 1972-October 1975
Zhao Ziyang: October 1975-December 1979
Lu Dadong (鲁大东): December 1979-April 1983
Yang Xizong (杨析综): December 1982-May 1985
Jiang Minkuan (蒋民宽): May 1985-January 1988
Zhang Haoruo (张皓若): January 1988-February 1993
Xiao Yang (肖秧): February 1993-February 1996
Song Baorui (宋宝瑞): February 1996-June 1999
Zhang Zhongwei (张中伟): June 1999-January 2007
Jiang Jufeng (蒋巨峰): January 2007-January 2013
Wei Hong (魏宏): January 2013–January 2016
Yin Li (尹力): January 2016–December 2020
Huang Qiang (黄强):  December 2020–present

List of chairmen of Sichuan People's Congress
Du Xinyuan (杜心源): 1979-1985
He Haoju (何郝炬): 1985-1993
Yang Xizong (杨析综): 1993-1998
Xie Shijie (谢世杰): 1998-2003
Zhang Xuezhong (张学忠): 2003-2007
Du Qinglin (杜青林): 2007
Liu Qibao: 2008-2013
Wang Dongming: 2013-2018
Peng Qinghua (彭清华): 2018-Incumbent
Wang Xiaohui (王晓晖): April 2022-present

List of the chairmen of CPPCC Sichuan Committee
Li Jingquan (李井泉): 1955-1965
Liao Zhigao (廖志高): 1965-1967
Du Xinyuan (杜心源): 1977-1979
Ren Baige (任白戈): 1979-1983
Yang Chao (杨超): 1983-1985
Feng Yuanwei (冯元蔚): 1985-1988
Liao Bokang (廖伯康): 1988-1993
Nie Ronggui (聂荣贵): 1993-2002
Qin Yuqin (秦玉琴): 2002-2008
Tao Wuxian (陶武先): 2008-2013
Li Chongxi: 2013-2014, removed from office for corruption
Ke Zunping (柯尊平): 2014-2022
Tian Xiangli (田向利): 2022-present

References

Sichuan
Sichuan